The northwestern garter snake (Thamnophis ordinoides) is a species of snake in the family Colubridae. The species is endemic to North America.

Geographic range
In the United States, T. ordinoides is found in California, Oregon, and Washington; in Canada, it is found in British Columbia.

Description
It is one of the most variable species of snakes in the world.

Habitat
The northwestern garter snake is most commonly found on the edge of meadows, surrounded by forest, as some sunshine is needed for its survival. It can also be found under stumps when it is too hot out.

Diet
T. ordinoides preys on slugs, salamanders, and frogs.

References

Further reading
Baird SF, Girard CF (1852). "Descriptions of new species of Reptiles, collected by the U. S. Exploring Expedition under the command of Capt. Charles Wilkes, U. S. N." Proc. Acad. Nat. Sci. Philadelphia 6: 174–177. (Tropidonotus ordinoides, new species, p. 176).
Behler JL, King FW (1979). The Audubon Society Field Guide to North American Reptiles and Amphibians. New York: Alfred A. Knopf. 743 pp., 657 plates. . (Thamnophis ordinoides, pp. 669-670 + Plate 512). 
Smith HM; Brodie ED Jr (1982). Reptiles of North America: A Guide to Field Identification. New York: Golden Press. 240 pp. . (Thamnophis ordinoides, pp. 150–151).

External links
Photo galleries and species account at California Herps

Thamnophis
Reptiles of the United States
Fauna of California
Fauna of the Northwestern United States
Biota of Oregon
Reptiles described in 1852
Taxa named by Spencer Fullerton Baird
Taxa named by Charles Frédéric Girard
Endemic fauna of the Pacific Northwest